is located in the former residence of Nihonga artist Yokoyama Taikan, overlooking Shinobazu Pond in Taitō, Tokyo, Japan. It was opened in 1976 and is operated by a foundation directed by his descendants.

History
Yokoyama Taikan moved to this address in 1909, and constructed a wooden two-story Sukiya-zukuri style house of his own design in 1918. The house served as both his residence and studio. He lived here until the house was destroyed during the Tokyo Air Raid of 1945. It was rebuilt is almost the same style after the war, and he took up residence again in 1954 until his death in 1958. The Japanese gardens at the residence provided inspiration for many of his works. The building was designated a Municipal Historic Site in 1994, and became a National Historic Site and also a Place of Scenic Beauty in 2017. 

The collection includes some 1200 objects, including 215 works and studies by the painter, as well as works acquired during the artist's life by other painters, such as Hishida Shunsō and Kanzan Shimomura. Exhibition changes are made every three months.

See also
 List of museums in Tokyo
 Ueno Park
 List of Historic Sites of Japan (Tōkyō)
 List of Places of Scenic Beauty of Japan (Tōkyō)

References

External links

 Yokoyama Taikan Memorial Hall 
Tokyo Cultural Properties Database

Art museums and galleries in Tokyo
Biographical museums in Japan
Historic Sites of Japan
Places of Scenic Beauty
Art museums established in 1976
1976 establishments in Japan
Buildings and structures in Taitō